Joan Lezaud (born 6 November 1985 in Arcachon) is a professional squash player who represented France. He reached a career-high world ranking of World No. 97 in November 2013.

References

External links 
 
 

1985 births
Living people
French male squash players